Anne Finucane (born 1952) is an American banker who is vice chair of Bank of America and chair of the board of Bank of America Europe. She leads the bank's socially responsible investing, global public policy, and environmental, social and corporate governance committee. She has worked in the banking industry since 1995, when she joined Fleet Financial, which later merged with the short-lived BankBoston to become part of Bank of America. She serves on the boards of several organizations. She lives in Lincoln, Massachusetts.

Early life and education
Finucane was born to an Irish-American family, and raised as the fourth of six children in Newton, Massachusetts. The lineages of both her parents trace back to County Cork. Her father, William, "was general counsel to the Boston Patriots and local banks. Her mother, Mary, was a homemaker and distant relative of Tip O'Neill. Finucane was friends with one of Robert Q. Crane's daughters, and Crane introduced Finucane to the then Mayor of Boston, Kevin White. Following completion of her studies at the University of New Hampshire, Finucane worked in the mayor's arts office.

Career in banking
Finucane entered the banking industry when she joined Fleet Financial in 1995, serving as head of corporate affairs and marketing. She worked to improve the bank's reputation following a subprime lending crisis, and helped in company acquisitions. Fleet Financial later merged with BankBoston, then Bank of America. Finucane became FleetBoston Financial's executive vice president for corporate marketing and communications. She was Bank of America's global chief strategy and marketing officer after the financial crisis of 2007–2008 when the bank lost 55% of its value, "symboliz[ing] all that was wrong" with US banks.

She became the company's vice chair in 2015. Finucane co-chairs the company’s sustainable markets committee, chairs the environmental, social and corporate governance committee, leads customer analytics, global marketing, and public policy strategies, and chairs the Bank of American Charitable Foundation. According to American Banker, she works with the White House and the World Economic Forum.

In mid-2017, Finucane was reportedly considered for Uber's vacant chief executive officer position, following the resignation of Travis Kalanick. In September 2017, she led the Bank of America's European bank board.

Recognition

Finucane ranked sixth on Boston list of "The 100 Women Who Run This Town" in 2010. She has ranked highly on lists of influential American women, including American Banker "most powerful women" lists in 2009, 2011–2012, and 2014–2017,
 Fortune "most powerful women" lists between 2016 and 2020,

 and Forbes "most powerful women" lists in 2019 and 2020.
Finucane was included in PRWeek 2013 "Power List", and ranked number 20 in Forbes 2014 list of "50 Most Influential CMOs" in the world. She was named to Barron's 100 Most Influential Women in U.S. Finance list in 2021. In 2019, Finucane was inducted into the American Advertising Federation's Advertising Hall of Fame. Other honors include induction into the Academy of Distinguished Bostonians by the Greater Boston Chamber of Commerce, and a Matrix Award from the Association for Women in Communications New York affiliate, both in 2013. Additionally, she was honored by the Roman Catholic Archdiocese of Boston's Planning Office for Urban Affairs for her "commitment and work in the name of social justice" in 2017.

Finucane was selected for the inaugural 2021 Forbes 50 Over 50; made up of entrepreneurs, leaders, scientists and creators who are over the age of 50.

Personal life
Finucane is married to the journalist Mike Barnicle, who has three children from another marriage; the couple have four adult children of their own, and live in Lincoln, Massachusetts. In 2012, Boston magazine included Finucane and Barnicle in a list of the city's "power couples". Finucane has been on the boards of The American Ireland Fund, Brigham and Women's Hospital, Carnegie Hall, CVS Health (since January 2011), the International Center for Journalists, the John F. Kennedy Presidential Library, Boston Public Library Foundation and Museum of Fine Arts, Boston, the John F. Kennedy Library Foundation, Partners HealthCare, and the Special Olympics. She is a member of the Council on Foreign Relations, and has been president of the Massachusetts Women's Forum.

References

External links
 
 
 

American people of Irish descent
American women bankers
American bankers
American women in business
Bank of America people
Living people
People from Boston
People from Lincoln, Massachusetts
People from Newton, Massachusetts
University of New Hampshire alumni
1952 births
21st-century American women